The Cloth Hall is a large cloth hall, a medieval commercial building, in Ypres, Belgium. It was one of the largest commercial buildings of the Middle Ages, when it served as the main market and warehouse for the Flemish city's prosperous cloth industry. The original structure, erected mainly in the 13th century and completed 1304, lay in ruins after artillery fire devastated Ypres in World War I. Between 1933 and 1967, the hall was meticulously reconstructed to its prewar condition, under the guidance of architects J. Coomans and P. A. Pauwels. At  in breadth, with a -high belfry tower, the Cloth Hall recalls the importance and wealth of the medieval trade city. The building now houses the In Flanders Fields Museum. In 1999, it was inscribed on the UNESCO World Heritage List as part of the Belfries of Belgium and France site, in recognition of their unique architecture, role in the advancement of civil liberties, and their civic, not religious, influence.

Building

In a row spanning the front of the edifice are tall pointed arches that alternately enclose windows and blind niches. Before the Great War, the niches framed life-size statues of historical personages, counts and countesses of Flanders. The niches on the side wings are now mostly vacant, but those in the centre contain statues of Count Baldwin IX of Flanders and Mary of Champagne, legendary founders of the building; and King Albert I and Queen Elisabeth, under whose reign the reconstruction began. Situated between these two couples, directly above the central archway entrance or Donkerpoort, is a statue of Our Lady of Thuyne, the patroness of Ypres.

The belfry, capped with four turrets and a spire, houses a carillon with 49 bells. From a pole atop the spire a gilded dragon overlooks the city. The tower offers an expansive view of the surroundings, and was used as a watchtower in centuries past. It has also accommodated the town archives, a treasury, an armory and a prison. In less enlightened times, cats were thrown off the belfry for reasons that are not clearly understood. One theory is that cats were in some way associated with black magic. A different theory is that cats were held to protect the cloth against mice, but the annual excess of kittens had to be dealt with in some way. Today, a jester commemorates this act by tossing stuffed toy felines from the tower during the triennial Cat Parade.

The Cloth Hall used to be accessible by boat via the Ieperlee waterway, which is now covered. The spacious ground-floor halls where wool and cloth were once sold are now used for exhibitions and tourist information; the second floor, formerly a warehouse, now hosts the In Flanders Fields Museum, dedicated to the history of World War I and also houses a World War I research centre. Via the museum, visitors can access the belfry tower.

Against the east face of the edifice stands the elegant Nieuwerck, whose Renaissance style contrasts markedly with the Gothic of the main building. Originally built between 1619 and 1622, and reconstructed after the war, this annex now serves as a town hall.

International significance

A painting of the Cloth Hall as it appeared in ruins in 1918, by Scottish-born artist James Kerr-Lawson, was one of over 1,000 pieces of art commissioned by the Canadian War Memorials Fund for part of a World War I memorial building that was planned after the war. However, the memorial building was eventually scrapped in favour of a memorial cenotaph at the centre of Confederation Square, across the street from Parliament Hill in Ottawa. The painting of the Cloth Hall, and seven other of the commissioned pieces, were instead hung in the Senate Chamber of the newly re-built Centre Block of parliament in 1921, and remains there today.

The design of the Calcutta High Court building, established on July 1, 1862 in the city of Calcutta (present-day Kolkata) in the Bengal Presidency of India during the British Raj, was inspired by the Ypres Cloth Hall, as were Sir George Gilbert Scott's design for the new main building of Glasgow University in 1870 and  W H Crossland's design for the Holloway Sanatorium at Virginia Water, Surrey, built 1873–85.

See also
 Calcutta High Court, a 19th-century copy of the Cloth Hall in Kolkata, India
 Delaware and Hudson Railway Building, a 20th-century copy of the Cloth Hall in Albany, New York, United States
 List of carillons in Belgium

References

External links

 Ypres: The Cloth Hall from Trabel.com
  Description and picture gallery from Belgiumview
 In Flanders Fields Museum

Rebuilt buildings and structures
Buildings and structures completed in 1304
Buildings and structures completed in 1967
Bell towers in Belgium
World War I museums in Belgium
Museums in West Flanders
Buildings and structures in Ypres
Medieval architecture